Eastern Gulf of Finland National Park is a national park in the Kymenlaakso region in Finland. The park consist only of small (under 1 km2) islands and islets, some of which grow forest, mostly pine trees.

Most of the islands are treeless rocks with sheer shores. Their sheerness is due to the rapakivi granite splitting in a sharply cubical manner.

The national park is known for its aquatic bird fauna. The most common aquatic birds are the goosander and tufted duck. Other birds, including the razorbill and black guillemot, nest on the park's protected islands.

See also 
 List of national parks of Finland
 Protected areas of Finland

References

External links
 Nationalparks.fi – Eastern Gulf of Finland National Park

Protected areas established in 1982
Geography of Kymenlaakso
Tourist attractions in Kymenlaakso
1982 establishments in Finland
National parks of Finland